Serampore Assembly constituency is an assembly constituency in Hooghly district in the Indian state of West Bengal.

Overview
As per orders of the Delimitation Commission, No. 186 Sreerampur Assembly constituency  is composed of the following: Ward Nos. 3 to 19 and 25 of Serampore Municipality, Rishra Municipality, Rajyadharpur and Rishra gram panchayats of Sreerampur Uttarpara community development block.

Sreerampur Assembly constituency is part of No. 27 Srerampur (Lok Sabha constituency).

Members of Legislative Assembly

Election results

2021
In 2021 West Bengal Assembly Election All Indian Trinamool Congress candidate Sudipta Roy defeated his nearest rival Kabir Sankar Bose of Bharatiya Janta Party by 23433 votes

2016
In the 2016 election, Sudipto Roy of Trinamool Congress defeated his nearest rival Subhankar Sarkar of Congress.

.# Swing calculated on Congress+Trinamool Congress vote percentages taken together in 2006. Intervening by election not taken into account because of lack of data.

2011

.# Swing calculated on Congress+Trinamool Congress vote percentages taken together in 2006. Intervening by election not taken into account because of lack of data.

2009 bye election
The bypoll to the Serampore Occurred Due To Resignation of the sitting MLA of AITC, Ratna De. Who Was Elected In Indian Parliament from Hooghly on 16 May 2009.

 

.# Swing calculated on Congress+Trinamool Congress vote percentages taken together, as well as the CPI vote percentage, in 2006. Data for comparison not available for the 2009 by-election.

1977-2009
In the 2009 by elections consequent to the election of Ratna De to Parliament from Hooghly (Lok Sabha constituency), Sudipto Roy of Trinamool Congress won the 180 Serampore assembly seat.

In the state assembly elections, contests in most years were multi cornered but only winners and runners are being mentioned. Ratna De defeated Dhirendra Nath Dasgupta of CPI in 2006 and Kesto Mukherjee, Independent, in 2001. Jyoti Chowdhury of Congress defeated Asimes Goswami of CPI(M) in 1996. Arun Kumar Goswami of Congress defeated Sanjay Deb Banerjee of Janata Dal in 1991, Ajit Bag of CPI(M) in 1987, and Kamal Krishna Bhattacharjee of CPI(M) in 1982. Kamal Krishna Bhattacharjee of CPI(M) defeated Gopal Das Nag of Congress in 1977.

1951-1972
Gopal Das Nag of Congress won in 1972 and 1971. Panchu Gopal Bhaduri of CPI won in 1969. Gopal Das Nag of Congress won in 1967. Panchu Gopal Bhaduri of CPI won in 1962 and 1957. In independent India's first election in 1951 Jitendra Nath Lahiri of Congress won the Serampore seat.

References

Assembly constituencies of West Bengal
Politics of Hooghly district